David A. Reingold (born 1968) is an American sociologist and higher education administrator. He is the Justin S. Morrill Dean of the Purdue University College of Liberal Arts. Previously he was the Executive Associate Dean at the Indiana University School of Public and Environmental Affairs from 2008-2015 and Director of Public Affairs and Public Policy Ph.D. Programs in the School of Public & Environmental Affairs from 2006-2008.

Education and career
David Reingold was born in 1968 in Chicago, Illinois and grew up in the Hyde Park neighborhood. He attended the University of Chicago Laboratory High School and received his B.A. from the University of Wisconsin-Madison. He earned his master's and doctorate from the University of Chicago’s Department of Sociology.

He became an Assistant Professor at Indiana University’s School of Public and Environmental Affairs in 1997, an Associate Professor with tenure in 2003, a Professor in 2009. He was also a Visiting Professor at Central European University, School of Public Policy in 2013-2015.

In 2006, he was named Director of Public Affairs and Public Policy Ph.D. Programs in the School of Public and Environmental Affairs at Indiana University.

In 2008, Reingold was named Executive Associate Dean for the School of Public and Environmental Affairs for the campus at Indiana University Bloomington.

In 2015, he was named Justin S. Morrill Dean of the College of Liberal Arts at Purdue University.

University leadership
In December 2014, Purdue University announced it had named Reingold the next dean of its College of Liberal Arts. He assumed office on March 1, 2015, as the Justin S. Morrill Dean of the College of Liberal Arts at Purdue University. A letter to the College's faculty and staff set the tone for his administration later that spring.

Launched in fall 2017 as a 15-credit certificate program, a new Cornerstone program established a faculty-taught first year sequence to fulfill core curriculum requirements in oral and written communication built around transformative texts, among the greatest that has been said and written. Cornerstone has gained significant notice in the higher education press.     Reingold advocated for the importance of general education classes at large research universities, referencing Cornerstone, in an op-ed for the Washington Post. 

On September 25, 2019, it was announced that Purdue University received a planning grant from Lilly Endowment Inc. to create a model program focused on developing curriculum around professional ethics at the intersection of the liberal arts and technological innovation. Reingold serves as principal investigator for the project. 

Reingold led a successful effort to launch a bachelor of arts degree in Music at Purdue, a first for the university. The Purdue Board of Trustees approved the new major in April 2021, followed by the Indiana Commission on Higher Education in May.  Students pursuing the degree will focus on music technology or general music studies.

In 2021, students and faculty in the Department of English contended that its graduate education budget would effectively shutter Purdue's creative writing program and its literary journal, Sycamore Review, which depends upon graduate students who staff the magazine. Reingold's public statement claimed that the department had overspent its 2020-21 graduate budget and made additional commitments that would not allow for the admission of new graduate students in Fall 2022, despite no reduction in the department's graduate education budget from 2021-22 to 2022-23. He maintained that the English Department faculty and leadership will determine the future of the program and the literary journal.   His claim that this was financially necessary was disputed by the English faculty and department.

Public service
From 2002-04 he was Director of the Office of Research and Policy Development for the U.S. Corporation for National and Community Service in Washington D.C.

References 

1968 births
Living people
American sociologists
American academic administrators
University of Wisconsin–Madison alumni
University of Chicago alumni